Bruce Bremner Russell (25 August 1859 – 13 May 1942) was an English international footballer, who played as a left back.

Career
Born in Kensington, Russell played for Royal Engineers, and earned one cap for England in 1883.

References

1859 births
1942 deaths
English footballers
England international footballers
Royal Engineers A.F.C. players
Association football fullbacks
Royal Engineers officers